Euphorbia parishii, known by the common name Parish's sandmat, is a species of euphorb. It is native to the sandy soils of the deserts in California and Nevada. It is a perennial herb forming a small patch on the ground. The slender, hairless, tangling stems have pairs of tiny, pointed oval leaves, each leaf just a few millimeters long. The minute inflorescence is a cyathium one millimeter wide. It is made up of several rounded nectar glands in shades of yellow to deep red surrounding many tiny male flowers and one female flower. The latter develops into a spherical fruit two millimeters wide.

External links
Jepson Manual Treatment
USDA Plants Profile
Photo gallery

parishii
Flora of California
Flora of Nevada
Flora of the California desert regions
Flora of the Sonoran Deserts
Natural history of the Mojave Desert
Natural history of the Colorado Desert
Flora without expected TNC conservation status